Sean Hanish is an American film writer, producer and director best known for Saint Judy, Return to Zero and Sister Cities.

Feature films

Return to Zero (2014) 

Return to Zero focuses on a successful couple who discover just before the due date of their first son that he has died in the womb and will be stillborn. Lives and relationship forever altered by the loss, nothing can save their marriage until they discover that they are again expecting and must face a turbulent and terrifying pregnancy together.

The cast includes Minnie Driver, Paul Adelstein, Alfred Molina, Connie Nielsen, Andrea Anders, Kathy Baker, and Sarah Jones.

Based on the true story of Sean and his wife Kiley's experience with stillbirth, Return to Zero was Lifetime’s first ever Global Premiere Film which was seen by over 4 million people when it premiered in May 2014 on Lifetime in the USA, Canada, the UK, and Southeast Asia.

Sister Cities (2016) 

Sister Cities tells the story of four estranged sisters who return home to mourn following their mother's alleged suicide and find a mystery waiting for them. When the sisters discover that mom's body is still in the tub, they confront Austin, the one daughter who has stayed behind. As suspicions grow, hard truths are revealed and their relationships with each other are thrown into turmoil.

The cast includes Jacki Weaver, Pretty Little Liar's Troian Bellisario, Castle's Stana Katic, Michelle Trachtenberg, Jess Weixler, Alfred Molina, Tom Everett Scott, Amy Smart, and Kaia Gerber.

Saint Judy (2018) 

Sean's third feature film, Saint Judy, is set to premiere March 1, 2019.

Saint Judy tells the true story of Los Angeles Immigration attorney Judy Wood, who single-handedly changed the United States Law of Asylum and saved countless lives in the process.

Awards and nominations
Return to Zero earned an Emmy nomination for its star, Minnie Driver, as well as Critics' Choice and Satellite Award nominations for her phenomenal performance. Sean received a WGA Award nomination for his screenplay, and the film won the International Press Association's Satellite Award for Best Motion Picture Made for Television.

Commercial work 
Sean also writes, directs, and produces commercials for a wide variety of international clients such as Cindy Crawford, Sofia Vergara, Eric Church, CBS, NFL, DISNEY, NCAA, Hallmark, Liz Claiborne, and Oscar De La Renta through his production company Cannonball Productions.

Education 
After studying under master film theorist David Bordwell at the University of Wisconsin, Sean completed his Master of Arts at the University of Southern California School of Cinema-Television.

References

Living people
University of Wisconsin–Madison alumni
USC School of Cinematic Arts alumni
American film producers
American screenwriters
American directors
Year of birth missing (living people)